The 2020–21 Incarnate Word Cardinals men's basketball team represented the University of the Incarnate Word during the 2020–21 NCAA Division I men's basketball season. The Cardinals were led by third-year head coach Carson Cunningham and played their home games at McDermott Convocation Center in San Antonio, Texas as members of the Southland Conference. They qualified for the Southland tournament for the first time in school history.

Previous season
The Cardinals finished the 2019–20 season 9–22, 6–14 in Southland play to finish in tenth place. They failed to qualify for the Southland tournament.

Roster

Schedule and results

|-
!colspan=9 style=| Non-conference Regular season

|-
!colspan=9 style=| Southland Regular season

|-
!colspan=9 style=| Southland tournament

Source:

References

Incarnate Word Cardinals men's basketball seasons
Incarnate Word
Incarnate Word Cardinals men's basketball
Incarnate Word Cardinals men's basketball